A validator is a computer program used to check the validity or syntactical correctness of a fragment of code or document. The term is commonly used in the context of validating HTML, CSS, and XML documents like RSS feeds, though it can be used for any defined format or language.

Accessibility validators are automated tools that are designed to verify compliance of a web page or a web site with respect to one or more  accessibility guidelines  (such as WCAG, Section 508 or those associated with national laws such as the Stanca Act).

See also
 CSS HTML Validator for Windows
 HTML Tidy
 W3C Markup Validation Service
 Well-formed element
 XML validation

References

External links 
 W3C's HTML Validator  
 W3C's CSS Validator 
 Mauve, an accessibility validator developed by HIIS Lab – ISTI of CNR of Pisa (Italy).
 WAVE – Online accessibility validator

Debugging
HTML
XML software